Heinrich Wilhelm Schwab (born 8 May 1938) is a German musicologist.

Career 
Born in Ludwigshafen Schwab received his doctorate from the University of Saarbrücken in 1964 with a thesis on the influences of 18th century music on that of the 19th century. From 1966 he took part in a research project at the University of Kiel that focused on Scandinavian and Baltic music history. Since 1998 he was professor for musicology at the University of Copenhagen. He has been a member of the Royal Swedish Academy of Music and the Norwegian Academy of Sciences since 1998, and of the Royal Danish Academy of Sciences and Letters since 1999 and since 2005 a member of the Academia Europaea. In 2009 he was awarded the Order of Merit of the Federal Republic of Germany on ribbon.

Publications 
 Sangbarkeit, Popularität und Kunstlied. Studien zu Lied und Liedästhetik der mittleren Goethezeit (1770–1814) (Studies on the history of music in the 19th century, vol. 3), Regensburg: Bosse 1965
 Das Einnahmebuch des Schleswiger Stadtmusikanten Friedrich Adolph Berwald.
 Die Anfänge des weltlichen Berufsmusikertums in der mittelalterlichen Stadt. Studie zu einer Berufs- und Sozialgeschichte des Stadtmusikantentums. Habil. Schrift, maschr. Privatdruck, Kiel 1977, 149 S. – (printed as) Kieler Schriften zur Musikwissenschaft, vol. 24, Kassel: Bärenreiter 1982
 Friedrich Ludwig Aemilius Kunzen (1761–1817). Stationen seines Lebens und Wirkens. [Catalogue of the] exhibition on the occasion of the anniversary of the appointment as music director of the Royal Danish Court Chapel in 1795 (Schriften der Schleswig-Holsteinischen Landesbibliothek, edited by Dieter Lohmeier, vol. 21), both in Holstein: Verlag Boyens & Co. 1995

References

External links 
 
 John Bergsagel: ”Schwab, Heinrich W(ilhelm)”. Grove Music Online. Oxford Music Online.

German  musicologists
Academic staff of the University of Kiel
Academic staff of the University of Copenhagen
Members of Academia Europaea
Members of the Royal Danish Academy of Sciences and Letters
Members of the Royal Swedish Academy of Music
Members of the Norwegian Academy of Science and Letters
Recipients of the Cross of the Order of Merit of the Federal Republic of Germany
1938 births
Living people
People from Ludwigshafen